The 2014 Texas Longhorns baseball team represented the University of Texas at Austin in the 2014 college baseball season. Texas competed in Division I of the National Collegiate Athletic Association (NCAA) as a  member of the Big 12 Conference. The Longhorns played their home games at UFCU Disch–Falk Field on the university's campus in Austin, Texas. Augie Garrido led the Longhorns in his eighteenth season as head coach.

Roster

Schedule

Ranking movements

References

External links
 Official website

Texas Longhorns baseball seasons
Texas
Texas
College World Series seasons
Texas